Donald Gray "Red" Laurence (born June 27, 1957) is a Canadian former professional ice hockey forward who played 79 games in the National Hockey League for the Atlanta Flames and St. Louis Blues between 1978 and 1980. The rest of his career, which lasted from 1977 to 1992, was spent in the minor leagues and then in Switzerland.

Career statistics

Regular season and playoffs

International

External links
 

1957 births
Living people
Atlanta Flames draft picks
Atlanta Flames players
Canadian ice hockey forwards
EV Zug players
HC Ambrì-Piotta players
Ice hockey people from Ontario
Indianapolis Checkers (CHL) players
Kitchener Rangers players
Lausanne HC players
Nova Scotia Voyageurs players
Peterborough Petes (ice hockey) players
Salt Lake Golden Eagles (CHL) players
Sportspeople from Cambridge, Ontario
St. Louis Blues players
Tulsa Oilers (1964–1984) players
Winnipeg Jets (WHA) draft picks